Dokležovje (or Deklezs, Prekmurje Slovene: Dekležovje) is a village in the Municipality of Beltinci in the Prekmurje region of northeastern Slovenia.

The parish church in the settlement is dedicated to Saint Stephen. It was built in 1844 and belongs to the Roman Catholic Diocese of Murska Sobota.

References

External links
Dokležovje on Geopedia

Populated places in the Municipality of Beltinci